TGS is a three-letter acronym which may refer to:

Educational establishments 
 Tadcaster Grammar School, North Yorkshire, England
 Takapuna Grammar School, Auckland, New Zealand
 The Geneva School, Winter Park, Florida
 Thetford Grammar School, Norfolk, England
 Think Global School, New York City, United States
 The Graduate School at Northwestern University. Illinois
 Tiffin Girls' School, Kingston upon Thames, England
 Tonbridge Grammar School, Tonbridge, England
 Toowoomba Grammar School, Toowoomba, Australia
 Tottenham Grammar School, London, England
 Townsville Grammar School, Townsville, Australia
 Trinity Grammar School, Melbourne, Australia
 Trinity Grammar School, Sydney, Australia

Companies 
 TGS Management, American quantitative hedge fund
 Transportadora de Gas del Sur, a Southern Natural Gas Transportation Company in Argentina
 TGS-NOPEC Geophysical Company, a Norwegian geoscience data, software and service provider

Computing 
 The Great Giana Sisters

Media 
 Teen Girl Squad, a subcartoon from the Homestar Runner website cartoons
 Tokyo Game Show, a video game trade show held in Tokyo
 Taipei Game Show, a video game trade show held in Taipei
 Toulouse Game Show, a video game trade show held in Toulouse, France
 The Gathering Storm (novel), by Robert Jordan, of the Wheel of Time series
 The Gamer Studio, a video gaming website.
 The Girlie Show (fictional show), a fictional show in the television series 30 Rock
 The Greatest Showman, a 2017 musical film
 The Glass Scientists, an independent webcomic

Music 
 Tokyo Girls' Style, a Japanese girl group

Science 
Triglycine sulfate, a material used in infrared sensors
Transcriptional gene silencing, a type of gene expression regulator